The Hotchkiss M1922 was a light machine gun manufactured by Hotchkiss.

It was never adopted in large numbers by the French Army; nevertheless, it was exported to many European and Latin American countries under the names Hotchkiss M1926 or Hotchkiss M1934.

Description
The Fusil-Mitrailleur (FM) Model 1922 is a classic weapon with a fixed stock, pistol grip and wooden handguard. It has a non-telescopic folding bipod. The cocking handle is on the right side, just like the ejection port. The FM's caliber varied with the user, being chambered in a wide range of calibres and fed from either 20-round overhead magazines or an extended feed strip (Greek model). Its maximum range is 2000m, and it had a regulator that could adjust the rate of fire.

Use 
The Hotchkiss M1922 was used with great success by the Greek Army during Greco-Italian War. It was also used by the Chinese Nationalist Army during the Second Sino-Japanese War to fight against the Japanese Imperial Army and was frequently used in the Spanish Civil War by the Nationalist and in small numbers, the Republicans.

Versions
There were several versions with different feed systems, calibers and improvements, among which were the Hotchkiss M1924 and M1926, the last of which spawned the Greek modified Hotchkiss machine gun.

Users

  - M1922 in 7×57mm Mauser
  - received 1000 M1924 (vz. 24) in 7.92×57mm Mauser
  - Mitrailleuse légère Hotchkiss type 1934, used in French colonies : Liban and French Indochina
  - 6.5×54mm Mannlicher–Schönauer and 7.92×57mm Mauser, 6000 used
  - ~3,500 in 7.92×57mm Mauser between 1931-1939
  - 3,000 Hotchkiss Model 1922 O.C. (Oviedo and A Coruña), in 7×57mm Mauser
  - from Spanish Army and Czechoslovakia
  - .303 British, only for evaluation
  - 7.92×57mm Mauser
  Viet Minh - used during First Indochina War

References

Light machine guns
Machine guns of France
World War II infantry weapons of France
World War II machine guns
M1922
World War II infantry weapons of Greece